Kepala Batas may refer to:
Kepala Batas, Penang, in Penang, Malaysia
Kepala Batas (federal constituency), represented in the Dewan Rakyat
Kepala Batas (state constituency), formerly represented in the Penang State Legislative Assembly (1959–74)
Kepala Batas, Kedah, in Kedah, Malaysia